Claudia Benitez-Nelson is a Latinx American oceanographer whose research focuses on marine geochemistry and biogeochemistry. A Carolina Distinguished Professor, she serves as the Senior Associate Dean for College Initiatives and Interdisciplinary Programs at the University of South Carolina’s College of Arts and Sciences.

Career and research
Claudia Benitez-Nelson grew up in Seattle, Washington and attended the University of Washington, where she earned B.S. Degrees in Chemistry and Oceanography in 1992. She received her doctoral degree in Oceanography from the Massachusetts Institute of Technology/Woods Hole Oceanographic Institution Joint Program in 1999. Upon graduation, Benitez-Nelson was named a National Oceanic and Atmospheric Administration (NOAA)/University Corporation for Atmospheric Research (UCAR) Postdoctoral Fellow at the University of Hawaii as well as a School of Ocean and Earth Science and Technology (SEOST) Young Investigator. In 2002, Benitez-Nelson joined the University of South Carolina (USC). She earned tenure and promotion to Associate Professor in 2006 and was promoted to Full Professor in 2010. Benitez-Nelson served as the Undergraduate Director and then Director of USC's Marine Science Program.

Benitez-Nelson’s research centers on the mechanisms that influence the formation, composition, and downward transport of material from the surface ocean to depth.  This research directly relates to biological production and diversity and the ocean’s role in the uptake and sequestration of greenhouse gases, nutrients, toxins and trace metals.  She has been a leader in developing new techniques that use both novel chemical approaches (i.e., Benitez-Nelson et al, 2004; Diaz et al, 2008; Sekula-Wood et al, 2009; McParland et al., 2015) and sample collection methods with naturally occurring short-lived radionuclides (i.e., Benitez-Nelson and Buesseler, 1998; Benitez-Nelson et al., 2001; Buesseler et al. 2001; Benitez-Nelson and Moore, 2006 (and references therein); White et al., 2013). She has authored or coauthored more than 130 articles, which have been published in premier, high impact journals such as PlosOne, Geophysical Research Letters, Nature and Science, and has been the principal investigator or co-principal investigator on substantial, multi-year research and education grants from the National Science Foundation (NSF) and the National Aeronautics and Space Administration (NASA), among others. Her research has received international acclaim and includes the Early Career Award in Oceanography from the American Geophysical Union (AGU), Fulbright and Marie Curie Fellowships, and being named National Academies of Science/Humboldt Foundation Kavli Fellow, an American Association for the Advancement of Science (AAAS) Fellow, and a Sustaining Fellow of the Association for the Sciences of Limnology and Oceanography (ASLO). Her many professional service duties include serving as Chair of the International Scientific Committee on Oceanic Research (SCOR) Capacity Building Committee, National Academy of Science Ocean Studies Board, and as an elected member of the AGU Ocean Sciences Section and ASLO Executive Committees. Benitez-Nelson is also highly regarded as a teacher, receiving many teaching honors, including the Mungo Distinguished Professor Award, the UofSC’s highest undergraduate teaching award.

Awards and honors
Benitez-Nelson was an elected fellow for the American Association for the Advancement of Science (AAAS) and has been awarded the Ocean Sciences Early Career Award by the American Geophysical Union (AGU). Some of her other awards and honors include:

 The Oceanography Society Mentoring Award, For Excellence and/or Innovation in Mentoring the Next Generation of Ocean Scientists, 2021
 Sustaining Fellow, Association for the Sciences of Limnology & Oceanography, 2017
 SEC Faculty Achievement Award, 2016
 Ada B. Thomas Outstanding Faculty Advisor of the Year Award, UofSC, 2016
 Sulzman Award for Excellence in Education and Mentoring, Biogeosciences Section, American Geophysical Union, 2014
 Mungo Distinguished Professor, UofSC, 2013
 National Academies of Science/Humboldt Foundation Kavli Fellow, 2012
 Faculty of the Year, National Award from the National Society of Collegiate Scholars (for outstanding undergraduate mentoring and leadership), 2005
 S. Carolina Alliance for Minority Participation (SCAMP) Outstanding Mentor, 2002
 Environmental Protection Agency STAR Graduate Fellowship, 1996-1998

Selected publications

External links
 Lab Website
 UofSC College of Arts and Sciences Webpage
 Telly Awards Article
 ORCID
 Google Scholar

References

Scientists from Seattle
University of South Carolina faculty
Massachusetts Institute of Technology School of Science alumni
Fellows of the American Association for the Advancement of Science
American oceanographers
Women oceanographers
Hispanic and Latino American scientists
21st-century American women scientists
Puerto Rican women scientists